Dan Matovina (born October 10, 1957) is known for his work as a recording engineer, record producer, and author of a book on Badfinger.

Matovina was born in Cleveland, Ohio. Beginning in the early 1980s, his music engineering included artists such as Pete Ham, Badfinger, New Edition, The Monkees, Manhattan Transfer, Frankie Valli, The Beach Boys, The Pandoras, Dean Ford, The Babys, James Lee Stanley, Primetime, The Long Ryders, 5 Guns West, Radio Cammon, Easter, The Rats, Derrick Anderson, Blood on the Saddle. and Jigsaw Seen.

His production work included Dean Ford, House of Freaks, Badfinger, Pete Ham The Clints, Karmann, On The Air.

In the early 1990s, Matovina began his research for his biography of the rock band Badfinger entitled Without You: The Tragic Story Of Badfinger (first published in 1997). A revised edition was made available in 2000 with a CD of rarities.

Notes

1957 births
Living people
Badfinger
People from Cleveland